Lint is a municipality located in the Belgian province of Antwerp. The municipality only comprises the town of Lint proper. In 2021, Lint had a total population of 8,575. The total area is 5.57 km².

Famous inhabitants
 Dirk Sterckx, member of the European Parliament (VLD)
 Nico Van Kerkhoven, football player, former in Belgium national team
 Matz Sels, football player
 Lea Couzin, actress,
 Karen Damen, singer, actress
 Anneke Van Hooff, singer, actress
 Ann Van den Broeck, musical actress
 Bart Debie, politician

References

External links
 
  

Municipalities of Antwerp Province
Populated places in Antwerp Province